Phils River, a watercourse that is part of the Lachlan catchment within the Murray–Darling basin, is located in the central western region of New South Wales, Australia.

The river rises on the western slopes of the Great Dividing Range, near Thalaba, below Big Magpie Hill, and flows generally north–east, before reaching its confluence with the Bolong River, east of Blanket Flat.

See also

 List of rivers of New South Wales (L–Z)
 List of rivers of Australia
 Rivers of New South Wales

References

Rivers of New South Wales
Murray-Darling basin